Viivi Pumpanen (born 20 July 1988) is a Finnish beauty pageant titleholder, who was crowned Miss Finland 2010, the official representative of Finland to the 2010 Miss Universe pageant. Pumpanen currently lives in Nurmijärvi.

Early life

Born in Vantaa, Pumpanen was Miss Helsinki in 2009.

Miss Finland 2010
As the 71st Miss Finland, Pumpanen accepted the crown from Essi Pöysti, the 2009 titleholder, on 17 January 2010 and said "I have been dreaming about this since I was eight years old. My mother and father have been supporting me."

She competed in the Miss Universe 2010 pageant on 23 August 2010 in Las Vegas, Nevada.

Tanssii tähtien kanssa

In 2011, Pumpanen won Tanssii tähtien kanssa, the Finnish version of Strictly Come Dancing. Her professional partner was Matti Puro.

References

External links
 Official Miss Suomi website

1988 births
Living people
Miss Finland winners
People from Vantaa
Miss Universe 2010 contestants
Dancing with the Stars winners